Emiliano Qirngnuq is a Canadian politician, who was elected as the Member of the Legislative Assembly for the electoral district of Netsilik in the Legislative Assembly of Nunavut at a by-election held 8 February 2016.

Qirngnuq is from the hamlet of Kugaaruk, Nunavut and was formerly the manager of the Koomiut Co-Op. Qirngnuq stated that he wanted to make language preservation a priority.

References

Living people
Members of the Legislative Assembly of Nunavut
Inuit from the Northwest Territories
Inuit politicians
People from Kugaaruk
21st-century Canadian politicians
Inuit from Nunavut
Year of birth missing (living people)